Anna Viktorovna Zubkova  (Анна Викторовна зубкова, born 3 February 1980) is a former water polo player of Kazakhstan. She was a part of the national team at the 2004 Summer Olympics. She was part of the Kazakhstani team at the  2013 World Aquatics Championships in Barcelona, Spain.

She is the twin sister of water polo player Anastasia Zubkova, who competed for Russia national team at the 2004 Olympics.

See also
 Kazakhstan at the 2013 World Aquatics Championships

References

External links

Kazakhstani female water polo players
Living people
Sportspeople from Chelyabinsk
1980 births
Water polo players at the 2004 Summer Olympics
Olympic water polo players of Kazakhstan
Asian Games medalists in water polo
Water polo players at the 2010 Asian Games
Twin sportspeople
Asian Games silver medalists for Kazakhstan
Medalists at the 2010 Asian Games
21st-century Kazakhstani women